The Doomguy (also spelt Doom Guy, as well as referred to as the Doom Marine, Doom Slayer or just the Slayer in Doom (2016) and Doom Eternal) is a fictional character and the protagonist of the Doom video game franchise of first-person shooters created by id Software. He was created by American video game designer John Romero. He was introduced as the player character in the original 1993 video game Doom. Within the Doom series, Doomguy is a demon hunter space marine dressed in green combat armor who rarely speaks onscreen, and his personality and backstory were intentionally vague to reinforce his role as a player avatar. In Doom Eternal, he is voiced by American voice actor Matthew Waterson, while Jason Kelley voices the character in that game's downloadable content The Ancient Gods: Part Two. He has appeared in several other games developed by id Software, including Quake Champions and Quake III Arena.

He has been featured in several other game franchises, including his likeness as a customizable skin for the Mii Gunner character in Super Smash Bros. Ultimate, being added as an outfit in Fall Guys, and an outfit in Fortnite. He received mainly positive reviews, with some critics praising him for being a competent protagonist.

Concept and creation
The Marine is not referred to by name in the original game. Romero described this choice as increasing player immersion: "There was never a name for the [Doom] marine because it's supposed to be YOU [the player]". The character sprites were created by Adrian Carmack, based on an initial sketch and clay model he made. In 2017, John Romero stated that he was the original model of the character for the cover box art. In 2020, Romero revealed that the real name of the character is Doomguy. In 2021, Doom Eternal's director Hugo Martin revealed that the female Doomguy was nearly added, but scrapped due to how much of an endeavor it would have been.

Tom Hall's original design draft, "The Doom Bible", described several planned characters, all of whom went unused in the final version. The sole non-playable character, Buddy Dacote, bore the most similarities to the original game's eventual protagonist. "Dacote" is an acronym for "Dies at conclusion of this episode", and Buddy was supposed to be killed by a boss at the end of the planned third episode. In the finished product, this nearly happens to the Marine in the final level of the first episode, but the player survives. Later, when asked, Tom Hall and John Romero confirmed that the Marine was, at least originally, a descendant of Wolfenstein protagonist B.J. Blazkowicz.

Characterization

Doom and Doom II
The unnamed protagonist of the series is a Marine who often referred to in the fan community as the "Doomguy". While id Software chose a somewhat generic pictorial representation of the Marine for the box art, as well as gameplay purposes (damage feedback, story transitions), the true identity of the Doom Marine is meant to be the player themselves and so these depictions should only be considered illustrative.

On the box art for the original Doom, which was done by Don Ivan Punchatz, this shows the Doomguy firing a weapon (which doesn't make an appearance in the final game) at a horde of Demons below him as one of them grabs his left wrist, while a fellow Marine (similar battle dress uniform, except in grey) in the background is rushing to catch up. This image is also used in the introduction screen of Doom, where the Doomguy has a shotgun clutched in his left hand, while a Baron of Hell kills the grey-uniformed Marine in the background. The Doomguy appears without a helmet, in the ending to The Ultimate Doom episode IV "Thy Flesh Consumed", then again in the cover art of Doom II where he is fighting a Cyberdemon with a shotgun. 

For the player's in-game avatar in single-player mode (also seen in the ending of Doom II), the Doomguy wears green armor and a light grey space helmet that conceals his facial features. Several corpses of other Marines are occasionally encountered, and they feature the same uniform as the Doomguy. In multiplayer mode there is a palette swap applied; with green and grey for players one and two in co-op, while in deathmatch there is a choice of green, red, brown and indigo/blue.  

For Doom and Doom II, the Doomguy's face is seen in the game's HUD, where it is shown as a white male with light brown hair, a buzz cut, and blue eyes. In Doom, Doom II, and Final Doom, the Marine expresses little emotion at the horror unfolding around him, maintaining a stern and alert glare, eyes constantly darting left and right. When the Marine takes damage, his reaction is a mixture of pain and anger. The Marine grins upon picking up a new weapon, and the most emotional face is seen when the Marine suffers 20 hit points or more taken away during a single attack, showing a shocked face.

The Marine in Doom 64 is less muscular, with slightly modified green armor with black highlights, a black helmet with an antenna, and a blue visor. In Wolfenstein RPG, it is hinted that the Doom 64 Marine is a descendant of William "B.J." Blazkowicz, to whom the Marine's helmetless look in the original games bears a striking similarity. In a reference to the Marine's confrontation with the Cyberdemon, when Blazkowicz defeats the "Harbinger of Doom", the creature states that he will return in the future to confront his descendants.

Doom 3
In Doom 3, the Marine's appearance is similar to that of his classic Doom incarnation as he wears green armor with exposed arms, but the Marine's facial features are not concealed, his muscular build is less exaggerated, and he has thick black hair. During the game the player can interact with several characters, most of whom, like Sergeant Kelly, give the player some briefing regarding his mission. The player character remains silent throughout and is portrayed as tough and fearless in the game's cut scenes; generally only glaring at the demons he sees. When he discovers the towering Cyberdemon for the game's final battle, however, he steps back in fear. 

The Doomguy in the expansion Doom 3: Resurrection of Evil is a different character than the Marine in Doom 3, being older and more heavyset with a buzz cut, and is a Marine combat engineer.

Doom (2016) and Doom Eternal
Contrary to previous incarnations, Doom (2016)'s Marine is more vaguely characterized: the Doom Slayer is never seen nor heard other than from the first person, and other than gameplay at the beginning of the game that shows him having a white skin color and the muscular masculine suit seen in the introduction, practically no details are revealed. The Doom Slayer's eyes and nose can be made out through the visor of his helmet on the game's box art, the 3D model viewer, and his Quake Champions appearance. It has been also noted for its visibly irreverent tone conveyed by its hand gestures, fist bumping a small Doomguy figurine, and a late-game moment where the Doom Slayer decides to make a backup of a friendly AI rather than erasing it.

Doom Eternal is more specific about The Slayer's characterization relative to the previous episode: Doomguy is seen without a helmet in first-person, and for the first time in the series' history, he also speaks, voiced in flashback by Matthew Waterson. He follows the streak for irreverence: a room in his Fortress of Doom is filled with comic books, collectible figurines, and guitars. Doomguy also contains alternate costumes, including a winged unicorn skin.

Appearances
Doomguy appears as the lead of the original 1993 video game Doom, and its sequels Doom II: Hell On Earth, and Doom 64, the 2004 series reboot Doom 3, and its expansion pack Doom 3: Resurrection of Evil, the 2016 series reboot, also titled  Doom, and in its sequel Doom Eternal.

Doomguy also appeared in the mobile game Doom RPG and Doom II RPG. and in  2016's Doom Pinball, the virtual pinball adaptation of that game developed by Zen Studios as one of the three tables of the Bethesda Pinball pack, an add-on for Zen Pinball 2, Pinball FX 2 and Pinball FX 3.

Other appearances
The Marine's corpse appears in a secret area in Duke Nukem 3D; they are seen halfway through their Classic Doom death animation clutching their throat and gurgling, surrounded by various Satanic iconography. Upon seeing them, Duke Nukem says, "That's one doomed space marine". Doomguy's outfit appears in Tony Hawk's Pro Skater 3. In the Saturn version of Quake, the Marine briefly appears at the end of the bonus feature "Dank & Scuz". Doomguy also appeared in Quake Champions. In Quake III Arena, the Marine appears in three levels under the name "Doom". The character "Phobos" is also a Doom Marine, though his skin is darker and his armor is orange rather than green. The third Doom Marine in the game, a woman named "Crash" is mentioned as being Doom's training instructor before arriving at the Arena. A Doomguy costume was made available in Fall Guys: Ultimate Knockout, along with Cyberdemon and Cacodemon on January 12, 2021, for a limited time. Doom Slayer appears as a Mii Fighter Costume in Super Smash Bros. Ultimate, which was released as downloadable content in October 2021. In December 4 2022, Doom Slayer appeared as an outfit alongside multiple other Doom themed cosmetics in the Fortnite Chapter 4, Season 1 Battle pass.

Novels
In the 1990s Doom novels, the main character is referred to as Flynn "Fly" Taggart. For the Doom 3 novels, the Marine's name is John Kane. His past is similar to that of the protagonist in the original Doom, having been demoted after disobeying the command to save some of his fellow marines. During the Hellish invasion, Kane is forced to take command of several of the surviving marines despite his stripped ranking. He battles the demons singlehandedly or with a few other marines. He is depicted as compassionate to his fellow survivors, working to save the child Theo and to save the damned in Hell. After volunteering to enter Hell to retrieve the soul cube, Campbell is shown as very impressed by him. He and Maria start to feel romantic ties to each other. During the end of Doom 3: Maelstrom, Kane's leg is blown off and he is admired as the "man who saved Mars City". He also appeared in  the point-and-click visual novel Doomed Love on Itch.io.

Film
Arnold Schwarzenegger, Vin Diesel and Dwayne Johnson were mooted for the role of Doomguy in the 2005 film Doom, with Karl Urban ultimately cast in the role of John "Reaper" Grimm in September 2004. Urban underwent military training for two weeks under military advisor Tom McAdams. The film's first person shooter sequence, told from Doomguy/Reaper's perspective, was completely directed by visual effects supervisor Jon Farhat and was filmed in 14 days after a planning period of three months. While the scene is one continuous shot, multiple cuts, that Farhat called "hook-ups", were made during filming, Farhat stated: "You can do it by moving a camera, and passing something, and cutting. And then rolling the camera again on a subsequent date." Other hook-up styles were used by using a green screen or blue screen when a door opens or jump cutting by whipping an object. Doomguy/Reaper's gun was only used on-screen when it was needed due to its size affecting the aspect ratio.

For the 2019 film Doom: Annihilation director Tony Giglio created the character of gender-swapped Doomguy Joan Dark after taking inspiration from The Terminator and Aliens, feeling that a female protagonist would be more effective in a sci-fi action film. Joan was named after Joan of Arc. Four suits were produced for the Imps, with one designed for leaping. Inspiration was drawn from Doomguy's depiction in the first three Doom games, as Universal did not retain the rights to the Bethesda version. Amy Manson and Agleya Gumnerova were then confirmed to have been cast in the role. Dark's depiction as Doomguy received negative criticism from fans.

Cultural impact

Reception

In 2009, GameDaily included the Doom Marine on its list of "ten game heroes who fail at the simple stuff" for his inability to look up and down in the original series. UGO Networks ranked the Marine fourth on its 2012's list of best silent protagonists in video games, noting his courage to continue in silence even when faced with Hell's army. In 2013, Complex ranked the Doom Marine at number 16 on its list of the greatest soldiers in video games for being "the original video game space marine" and "one of the classic silent protagonists". Both CraveOnline and VGRC ranked the Marine the fifth most "badass" male character in the video game's history. Kirk McKeand of VG247 described Doomguy as "Jesus with a super shotgun". David Houghton of GamesRadar claimed that Doomguy is the smartest player character around, even with fistbumps, violence and zero dialogue. In 2021, Rachel Weber of GamesRadar ranked him as 47th iconic video game character.

The Doom Marine's 2016 incarnation has received special acclaim for its characterization and how the game presents the player character as a representation of the player playing Doom: writing for GamesRadar, David Houghton called the presentation "incidental, not explicit", which allows the players to immerse completely in the character. Christian Donlan writing for Eurogamer theorised that "the guy in Doom is playing Doom", and explained that the main character's impatience with exposition is analogous to "the temporary frustration of being inside Doom while not being able to play Doom". In his column Extra Punctuation Ben Croshaw wrote that the game "establishes the player character as someone who doesn't give a flake of dried Marmite for the larger context, and only cares about ridding the planet of demons. Which is hopefully representative of the player's motivation." Additional praise was given for the subtlety of Doomguy's expressions: Jim Sterling noted that both the "glory kill" moves and additional pieces of animation "reinforce his consistent sense of irreverence", Sterling, along with a number of other reviewers including Houghton, Conlan, and Croshaw from Zero Punctuation noted the initial moment of the game with Doomguy throwing away a communications monitor while a mission briefing plays as a minimalistic, but effective way to convey the entire character's motivations. Cody Gravelle of Screen Rant criticized Doomguy's winged unicorn skin alternate custome, noting that the skin was great, but somehow missed the crossover opportunity, such as adding Isabelle skin from Nintendo'''s Animal Crossing: New Horizons.

Doomguy was a popular choice for inclusion in the roster of Super Smash Bros. by fans, and also by multiple websites, including PC Gamer, GamingBolt, GameRevolution, and Shacknews staffs.

In popular culture
The character has been the subject of extensive fan art. One popular variant involving them has fans creating and sharing images of his hypothetical visage using 3D graphics software program and AI enhancements on social media platforms. In May 4, 2021, Bethesda featured Doomguy as part of a Star Wars Day tribute on its official Twitter account. In October 2021, after the addition of Doom Guy as a mii fighter costume in Super Smash Bros. Ultimate, together with Isabelle on the roster, the final update of the game was dubbed "friendship" and "love story" by video game publications.

When Doom Eternal was delayed and released the same day as Animal Crossing: New Horizons, fans of both games began creating and sharing artwork depicting Doom Slayer and Isabelle together as friends, which eventually trended on social media in 2020. Commentators responded positively towards the fan-made pairing, including acknowledgments from Aya Kyogoku, director of New Horizons,
as well as Bethesda. The Doomguy and Isabelle friendship pairing has also been subject to other forms of fan labor, like a fan video and cosplay.

Promotion and merchandise
In September 2020, Limited Run Games offered a Doomguy Helmet Collector's Bundle, which includes a wearable "full-size" helmet, a recreation of the game's original floppy disk pin, and a limited edition print. McFarlane Toys released two Doomguy Figurines. Animal Crossing's Isabelle and Doomguy mashup Amiibo has been also made and gets a seal approval from New Horizon's director and producer. In 2020, subscribers to twitch prime were entitled to an 1980s style blonde mullet themed Doom Eternal'' skin for Doomguy. In April 2021, the Xbox brand released a series of portraits featuring Doomguy and Master Chief to commemorate Microsoft's acquisition of Bethesda Softworks' parent company ZeniMax Media.

See also
 Interdimensional being
 B.J. Blazkowicz
 Gordon Freeman
 Master Chief (Halo)
 Duke Nukem (character)
 Samus Aran

References

Sources

Bethesda characters
Doom (franchise)
Fictional characters without a name
Fictional demon hunters
Fictional energy swordfighters
Fictional gunfighters in video games
Fictional mass murderers
Fictional sole survivors
Fictional super soldiers
Fictional swordfighters in video games
Fictional characters with post-traumatic stress disorder
Fictional United Nations personnel
First-person shooter characters
Male horror film characters
Horror video game characters
Male characters in video games
Microsoft protagonists
Science fiction film characters
Science fantasy video game characters
Silent protagonists
Fictional soldiers in video games
Space marines
Video game characters introduced in 1993
Video game mascots
Video game characters who can turn invisible
Video game characters with accelerated healing
Video game characters with superhuman strength
Video game characters with slowed ageing
Video game memes